"It Could Have Been Me" is a song written by Gloria Sklerov and Harry Lloyd . The song was originally recorded by Vicki Lawrence in 1972.  Though not released as a single, it was included on her debut LP, The Night the Lights Went Out in Georgia.

"It Could Have Been Me" is a torch song, with the singer expressing regrets about separating from her erstwhile love upon witnessing his marriage to another woman. She awakens to learn that it was only a dream, and that he is her fiancé.

Sami Jo Cole recording
In 1974 song was recorded by Sami Jo Cole. It became a pop hit in both the U.S. (#46) and Canada (#45). It was a bigger hit on the Adult Contemporary charts, reaching #31 and #12 in those nations, respectively. It was the follow-up to her debut hit, "Tell Me a Lie," and both songs were released in advance of her first LP.

Chart history

Weekly charts

References

External links
 Lyrics of this song
 
 

1972 songs
1974 singles
Vicki Lawrence songs
MGM Records singles
Torch songs